(born  August 3, 1979, in Osaka) is a female Japanese singer working under the FIX Records label, distributed by King Records. Her two singles "Musōka" and "Hikari no Kisetsu" were both used as opening themes for the anime Utawarerumono and Asatte no Hōkō respectively. Additionally, her song ""Kimi ga Tame" was featured in episode twenty-six of Utawarerumono. Her song "Tomoshibi" was used as the ending theme of the anime To Heart 2. Her name is derived from the Indonesian word for "voice" . She married composer and arranger Junpei Fujita in 2009.

Discography

Singles 
Musou Uta (夢想歌) April 26, 2006
Hikari no Kisetsu (光の季節) October 25, 2006
Ichibanboshi (一番星) February 28, 2007
BLUE / Tsubomi -blue dreams- (BLUE / 蕾 -blue dreams-) October 24, 2007
Wasurenaide (忘れないで) January 23, 2008
Mai Ochiru Yuki no You ni January 28, 2009
Free and Dream April 22, 2009
adamant faith June 24, 2009
Akai Ito (赤い糸) October 28, 2009
Fly away -Oozora he- (Fly away -大空へ-) January 15, 2014
Fuantei na Kamisama (不安定な神様) November 4, 2015
Amakakeru Hoshi (天かける星) January 27, 2016

Digital singles
Sakura (桜) January 20, 2011
Kimi ga Ita Natsu no Hi (君がいた夏の日) June 30, 2011
Tsuki Akari ni Terasarete (月明かりに照らされて) September 22, 2011
I'm a beast March 20, 2013
Nue Dori (ヌエドリ) September 30, 2015
Merry Christmas December 16, 2015
Honoo no Tori (焔の鳥) July 30, 2016
Hikari (星灯) September 21, 2016

Other singles
Hello (Suara with Haruna Ikeda) November 25, 2005
Niji Iro no Mirai (Suara with Rena Uehara and Akari Tsuda) March 7, 2012
Future World (Suara)|Future World (Suara with Akari Tsuda) May 23, 2012
Card of the Future (Suara with Psychic Lover) February 19, 2014
V-ROAD (As a member of BUSHI 7) April 23, 2014

Albums 
Yumeji (夢路) September 27, 2006 Re-released on April 22, 2015 with a bonus track
Taiyou to Tsuki (太陽と月) August 27, 2008
Kizuna (キズナ) August 19, 2009
Karin (花凛) October 26, 2011
Koe (声) October 14, 2015

Best albums
The Best ~Tie-Up Collection~ (The Best ～タイアップコレクション～) September 26, 2012
Utawarerumono Itsuwari no Kamen & Futari no Hakuoro Kashu (「うたわれるもの 偽りの仮面&二人の白皇」歌集)  November 9, 2016

Other albums
Amane Uta (アマネウタ) (Mini-album) January 25, 2006 Re-released on July 21, 2010 with a bonus track
Suara LIVE 2010 ~Utahajime~ (Suara LIVE 2010 ～歌始め～) (Live Album) June 23, 2010

DVD/Blu-ray 
 , released 2007-11-28

References

External links 
  
 
 Interview on Kochipan(in French)

Anime musicians
Lantis (company) artists
Living people
People from Toyonaka, Osaka
Musicians from Osaka Prefecture
1979 births
21st-century Japanese singers
21st-century Japanese women singers